Acheron Fossae is a trough in the Diacria quadrangle of Mars.  Its location is centered at 37.67° north latitude and 135.87° west longitude.  It is 718 km long and is named after a classical albedo feature at 35°N, 140°W .  The trough has seen intensive tectonic activity in the past. Despite its crescent shape similar to the nearby aureole surrounding Olympus Mons, it is unrelated to them and predates the aureole which are Amazonian in age while Acheron is Hesperian in age.

The term "fossae" is used to indicate large troughs when using geographical terminology related to Mars. Troughs, sometimes also called grabens, form when the crust is stretched until it breaks, which forms two breaks with a middle section moving down, leaving steep cliffs along the sides. Sometimes, a line of pits form as materials collapse into a void that forms from the stretching.

See also

 Fossa (geology)
 Geology of Mars 
 HiRISE
 HiWish
 Acheron

References

Valleys and canyons on Mars
Diacria quadrangle